Alipur is a village of Kendua Upazila in Netrokona District in the Division of Mymensingh, Bangladesh.

Geography
It has 500 households and a total area of 0.3 km2.

References

External links
 Bangladesh postal codes
 The Paurashava Ordinance 1977